James Edward Rosecrans (January 13, 1953 – December 22, 2022) was an American football linebacker. He played one game for the New York Jets of the National Football League (NFL) in 1976. He played college football at Penn State University. 

Rosecrans died on December 22, 2022, at the age of 69.

References 

1953 births
2022 deaths
People from Asheville, North Carolina
Players of American football from North Carolina
American football linebackers
Penn State Nittany Lions football players
New York Jets players